Thierry Martin de Beaucé (14 February 1943 – 25 November 2022) was a French high official, a student of the École nationale d'administration (1967–1968), writer and politician.

De Beaucé sat in several ministerial cabinets and then became a cultural advisor in Japan before joining the French Embassy in Rabat. He was appointed Director of International Relations at Elf Aquitaine, where he remained from 1981 to 1986. He was then Director General of Cultural, Scientific and Technical Relations at the Quai d'Orsay before becoming Secretary of State to the Minister of Foreign Affairs, responsible for international cultural relations (1988–91) in the second cabinet of Michel Rocard.

De Beaucé prepared and passed in 1990 the law creating the Agence pour l'enseignement français à l'étranger.

After the resignation of Michel Rocard, he was appointed chargé de mission at the Élysée, still under the presidency of François Mitterrand, then ambassador of France to Indonesia. He ended his professional career as director of international relations of the company Vivendi, then directed by Jean-Marie Messier.

In 1985, he won the Prix Contrepoint with his novel La chute de Tanger published the previous year.

Works 
1975: Les raisons dangereuses
1978: Un homme ordinaire
1979: L'île absolue. Essai sur le Japon, 
1981: Le désir de guerre, Hachette
1984: La chute de Tanger, Éditions Gallimard , Prix Contrepoint (1985)
1988: Nouveau discours sur l'universalité de la langue française, Gallimard, 
1989: Le Livre d'Esther, Grasset
1998: L'Archipel des épices, Plon
1991: La république de France, Grasset & Fasquelle
1995: La Nonchalance de Dieu, 
2006: L'absent de Marrakech, Éditions du Rocher, 2006

References

External links 
 Thierry de Beaucé on Les Après-midi de Saint-Loup
  Thierry de Beaucé. L'Ile absolue. Essai sur le Japon (compte rendu) on Persée
 Publications on CAIRN
 Thierry de Beaucé on Politiquemania

1943 births
2022 deaths
20th-century French writers
20th-century French male writers
École nationale d'administration alumni
Civil servants from Lyon
Writers from Lyon
Politicians from Lyon